The FIBA Oceania Championship for Men 2009 was the qualifying tournament of FIBA Oceania for the 2010 FIBA World Championship in Turkey. For the first time, the tournament featured a best-of-two, home-and-away series between Australia and New Zealand. Game one was held in Sydney, New South Wales followed by the second game in Wellington. The two countries split the series, and the tiebreaker, which was won by New Zealand, was the aggregate score. This was New Zealand's second title in an Oceania tournament contested by Australia and third title overall. Australia and New Zealand both qualified for the 2010 FIBA World Championship.

Teams that did not enter

Squads

Venues

Results 
|}

In Game 1, Australia squeezed out a seven-point home victory after trailing by three going into the fourth quarter. Joe Ingles scored ten straight points in a 90-second span in the fourth quarter to help the Boomers take control of the game.

In Game 2, New Zealand needed to win by eight or more to capture the Oceania title. Trailing by two at halftime, the Tall Blacks blew the game open in the third quarter by outscoring the Australians 36-15. Mika Vukona had 25 points and 12 rebounds and Kirk Penney added 24 points, 7 rebounds, and 10 assists to lead the Tall Blacks to their biggest win ever over Australia. With the victory, New Zealand took home the Al Ramsey Shield, given to the Oceanian champions, and will receive a higher seed than the Aussies at the 2010 FIBA World Championship.

References

External links 
 FIBA Oceania website

FIBA Oceania Championship
Championship, 2009
2009 in New Zealand basketball
2009–10 in Australian basketball
International basketball competitions hosted by Australia
International basketball competitions hosted by New Zealand
Australia men's national basketball team games
New Zealand men's national basketball team games